The Belgium women's national under-16 and under-17 basketball team is a national basketball team of Belgium, administered by the Basketball Belgium.
It represents the country in international under-16 and under-17 (under age 16 and under age 17) women's basketball competitions.

Competitive record

See also
Belgium women's national basketball team
Belgium women's national under-19 basketball team
Belgium men's national under-17 basketball team

References

External links

Archived records of Belgium team participations

Women's national under-17 basketball teams
Basketball